Cleomella is a small genus of about ten species of flowering plants. Like their relatives, the cleomes, plants of this genus have traditionally been included in the caper family Capparaceae but have recently been moved into a new family, Cleomaceae. Cleomella are annual wildflowers native to the dry and desert regions of western North America. They are similar to cleomes in appearance. They are erect and branching with leaves divided into three leaflets and inflorescences of yellow flowers with long stamens. Cleomella species are known commonly as stinkweeds or simply cleomellas.

Species include:
Cleomella angustifolia - narrowleaf rhombopod
Cleomella arborea - bladderpod
Cleomella brevipes - shortstalk stinkweed
Cleomella hillmanii - Hillman's stinkweed
Cleomella longipes - Chiricahua Mountain stinkweed
Cleomella macbrideana - MacBride cleomella
Cleomella obtusifolia - Mojave stinkweed
Cleomella palmeriana - Rocky Mountain stinkweed
Cleomella parviflora - slender stinkweed
Cleomella plocasperma - twisted cleomella

References

External links
Jepson Manual Treatment

 
Brassicales genera